Baskets Oldenburg, for sponsorship reasons EWE Baskets Oldenburg, is a professional basketball club that is based in the city of Oldenburg, Germany. The club plays in the Bundesliga. The club's name is derived from the team's main sponsor EWE AG, which is an electric utility company. The club's home arena is the Große EWE Arena.

History
The EWE Baskets Oldenburg club's origins began in the year 1954, as the basketball department of the Oldenburger TB sports club. In the year 2001, the basketball department of Oldenburger TB formed a new separate club, called EWE Baskets Oldenburg. The Oldenburger TB team then started to function as the development team of EWE Baskets.

In the 2008–09 season, EWE Baskets Oldenburg achieved their greatest success, by winning the German League championship title. As German Champion, Oldenburg won the right to play in the EuroLeague, during the next season of 2009–10.

In 2015, they won the German Cup title, while being host to the Cup Final Four. In the Cup Semi-final, Oldenburg beat Bonn, by a score of 71–77, and in the Cup Final, the team was too strong for Bamberg, as they beat them by a score of 70–72.

Arenas

Oldenburg's home games take place at the 6,000 seat Große EWE Arena, which opened in 2013.

Honors
Total titles:

Domestic competitions
Basketball Bundesliga
Champions: 2008–09
Runners-up: 2012–13, 2016–17
BBL-Pokal
Champions: 2015
BBL Champions Cup
Champions: 2009

European competitions
FIBA EuroChallenge
Third place: 2012–13

Players

Retired numbers

Current roster

Individual awards

BBL Most Valuable Player
Jason Gardner – 2009
Will Cummings – 2019
BBL Finals MVP
Rickey Paulding – 2009
All-BBL First Team
Jason Gardner – 2008, 2009
Rickey Paulding – 2008, 2009, 2013, 2016
Brian Qvale – 2016
Chris Kramer – 2017

All-BBL Second Team
Tyron McCoy – 2005
Je'Kel Foster – 2010
Adam Chubb – 2013
Julius Jenkins – 2014
Vaughn Duggins – 2016
Rickey Paulding – 2017
Brian Qvale – 2017

Notable players

Season by season

Colors and logos
The traditional colors of the EWE Baskets Oldenburg basketball club are yellow and blue. From 2009 to 2018, the team adopted a slightly reworked logo, this time with a white background and which again featured an eagle. In 2018, the club adopted its massively modernized current logo, now round and with a different shade of blue. The eagle however is still on it.

References

External links

Eurobasket.com team profile

Basketball teams in Germany
Basketball teams established in 1954
Sport in Lower Saxony
Sport in Oldenburg (city)
1954 establishments in Germany